The Regulatory Affairs Journal Pharma (RAJ Pharma) is an  English language  international pharmaceutical information and analysis service published by Informa plc. First published as a monthly print magazinel in 1992, it includes articles covering worldwide regulatory affairs within the pharmaceutical industry. The journal has now developed into   an online global business intelligence and analysis service. It provides daily news and analysis of developments in regulation of the pharmaceutical industry worldwide, including regulatory agencies and legislation, application requirements and guidelines, patents and intellectual property, research and development, international harmonisation, paediatric legislation, pharmacovigilance and pharmacoeconomics.

Articles are written by a four-person in-house editorial team, sourced from locally based correspondents from around the world, and independent contributors from legal firms, pharmaceutical companies and regulatory agencies. The RAJ Pharma editorial board comprises a range of regulatory experts from industry and agencies alike.

RAJ Devices
A sister publication, RAJ Devices, covers regulatory affairs within the medical technology industry. It was established in 1995.

References

External links
RAJPharma.com  RAJ Pharma homepage 
RAJDevices.com RAJ Devices  homepage

Business magazines published in the United Kingdom
Monthly magazines published in the United Kingdom
Legal magazines
Magazines published in London
Magazines established in 1992
Pharmaceutical industry